Rodríguez de Mendoza is a province of the Amazonas Region, Peru. It is located in the southeast part of the department of Amazonas. It borders on the west with the province of Chachapoyas and on the north, east and south with the department of San Martin. It was created by law 7626 on October 31, 1932 and its capital is Mendoza.

The province has an enormous importance because of the fertility of its soils, its benign climate and the big rivers that pass through its territory. Between these rivers we have San Antonio, Aiña, Pachca, Omia and Shocol or Milpuc. In its extensive tropical forests, there are spectacled bears and one variety of hummingbird (Loddigesia mirabilis).

Political division

Rodríguez de Mendoza is divided into twelve districts, which are:

External links
Rodríguez de Mendoza province official website 

Provinces of the Amazonas Region